John Rolph may refer to:

John Rolph (judge), American Deputy Judge of the Guantanamo Military Commissions
John Rolph (politician), Upper Canadian political figure

See also
John Rolfe (disambiguation)